Alison Elizabeth Broinowski,  ( Woodroffe; born 25 October 1941) is an Australian academic, journalist, writer and former Australian public servant.

Biography
Alison Woodroffe was born in Adelaide, South Australia, on 25 October 1941. She attended from 1946 to 1958 the Wilderness School in that city, and in 1962 she graduated with a Bachelor of Arts degree from the University of Adelaide. In December of the following year, she married diplomat Richard Philip Broinowski. From 1963 to 1964, she was a cadet for the Australian Department of External Affairs before beginning her extensive public service career, including various diplomatic postings, with the Department of Foreign Affairs (DFAT).

In July 2013, Broinowski announced her intention to run as The Wikileaks Party in New South Wales Senate candidate for at the 2013 Australian federal election. Broinowski was appointed a Member of the Order of Australia in the 2019 Australia Day Honours in recognition of her "significant service to international relations as an academic, author, and diplomat".

Career
 1965–68 –  Freelance journalist in Japan
 1969    –  Journalist and leader-writer for the Canberra Times
 1970–74  – Department of Foreign Affairs, Japan Section
 1975–78  – Second Secretary at the Australian Embassy in Manila, Philippines
 1978–82  – ASEAN Section, Department of Foreign Affairs; Co-ordinator, Australian Institute of International Affairs Conferences
 1982–83  – Administrative Assistant to the Governor General; Executive Director of the Australian National Word Festival
 1983–85  – Cultural Counsellor at the Australian Embassy in Tokyo, Japan
 1986     – Director, Japan Section, Department of Foreign Affairs and Trade
 1987–88  – Director, Australia-Japan Foundation, Department of Foreign Affairs and Trade; visiting fellow at the Department of Asian Studies, Australian National University
 1988     – Chargé d'Affaires with the Australian Embassy in Amman, Jordan, and research associate with the Korean Research Foundation and Yonsei University in Seoul, South Korea
 1989–90  – Counsellor with the Australian Mission to the United Nations in New York City, United States
 1990–92  – On leave from the Department of Foreign Affairs and Trade to undertake freelance work, including lecturing, journalism, broadcasting and research on Australia/Asian affairs
 1992–93  – Regional Director with the Department of Foreign Affairs and Trade in Melbourne
 1993–94  – Director, Advocacy and Planning, Australia Council
 1995     – Visiting Fellow, Australian Defence Force Academy
 1995–96  – Research Associate, Ibero American University, Mexico
 1996     – Visiting Fellow, University of Canberra
 1996–99  – Visiting Fellow, Australian National University

Bibliography

Books
 1992: The Yellow Lady : Australian Impressions of Asia (Melbourne: Oxford University Press) 
 1996: The Yellow Lady : Australian Impressions of Asia, 2nd edition  (Melbourne: Oxford University Press) 
 2003: About Face : Asian Accounts of Australia, (Melbourne: Scribe Publications)
 2003: Howard's War (Scribe Publications) (Scribe Short Books) 
 2004: as editor, Double Vision: Asian Accounts of Australia (Canberra: Pandanus Books) 
 2005: with James Wilkinson, The Third Try: Can the UN Work? (Scribe Publications) (Scribe Short Books)
 2007: "Allied and Addicted" (Scribe Publications) (Scribe Short Books)

Articles
 "A Long Journey on the Ikebana Road", The National Library of Australia Magazine,  8 (1): 20–23.

References

External links
 Papers of Alison Broinowski
 Dr Alison Broinowski – Faculty of Asian Studies
 Foreign Affairs – Book Review – Understanding ASEAN – Edited by Alison Broinowski
 Alison Broinowski Books – List of books by Alison Broinowski

1941 births
Australian activists
Australian diplomats
Australian freelance journalists
Academic staff of the Australian National University
Australian public servants
Australian women diplomats
Australian women journalists
Living people
Members of the Order of Australia
Writers from Adelaide
The Canberra Times people
WikiLeaks Party politicians
University of Adelaide alumni